The Rhein-Main Air Base bombing was a terrorist car bomb attack against the American Rhein-Main Air Base near Frankfurt am Main in West Germany on 8 August 1985. Two Americans were killed and more than 20 people were injured. The blast was powerful and caused debris and damage to the base including to 30 vehicles, trees and windows.

The attack was orchestrated by the left-wing Red Army Faction (RAF) and the French Action Directe groups. It was the worst attack on an American installation in Germany since Ramstein Air Base was bombed in 1981, also by the RAF. The attack came less than two months after the Frankfurt airport bombing, although the two were not related.

In preparation for the attack, RAF members lured and killed American soldier Edward Pimental in Wiesbaden. They used Pimental's identification to gain entry into the air base the next day where they carried out the attack. The bomb was placed in a Volkswagen Passat with fake American military plates.

Victims
One of the fatal victims of the attack was 19-year-old Airman Frank H. Scarton from Woodhaven, Michigan, who was on temporary duty in West Germany and normally serving at Charleston Air Force Base in South Carolina. The other victim was Becky Jo Bristol of San Antonio, Texas, the wife of Senior Airman John Bristol, who served at the Rhein-Main base.

Aftermath
A White House spokesman called it a "shameful attack".

Eva Haule, leader of the RAF, was arrested in 1986. In 1993, by now already serving a 15-year prison sentence for other terror offences, she was tried for the Rhein-Main base attack. Her defending lawyer claimed the attack was a "legitimate means of resistance against American imperialism". She was released on parole in 2007.

See also
West Berlin discotheque bombing
1987 Rheindahlen bombing
1988 Naples bombing

References

External links
 Stars & Stripes article on Rhein-Main car bomb 1985

1985 in West Germany
1980s in Hesse
1985 murders in Germany
Attacks on military installations in the 1980s
August 1985 crimes
August 1985 events in Europe
Improvised explosive device bombings in 1985
Murder in Hesse
Terrorist incidents in Germany in 1985
Building bombings in Germany
Red Army Faction